Augustin Mouterde (born 25 September 1991) is a French lightweight rower. He won a gold medal at the 2016 World Rowing Championships in Rotterdam with the lightweight men's coxless pair.

References

1991 births
Living people
French male rowers
World Rowing Championships medalists for France